Metasia acharis is a moth in the family Crambidae. It was described by Edward Meyrick in 1889. It is found on New Guinea and Australia, where it has been recorded from Queensland.

The wingspan is about 15 mm. The wings are pale brown with a pattern of dark brown zigzag lines.

References

Moths described in 1889
Metasia